Eyitayo Lambo was appointed the Nigerian Federal Minister of Health in July 2003, holding office until May 2007 during the second term of the presidency of Olusegun Obasanjo.

Background
Lambo was born on 28 December 1944 in Isanlu, the headquarters of Yagba East local government area in Kogi State, Nigeria. He attended the University of Ibadan, University of Rochester (USA) and University of Lancaster (UK).

He earned B.Sc. and M.A. degrees in economics and a Ph.D. degree in operational research applied to health systems. Professor Lambo taught at the undergraduate and graduate levels in the Universities of Ibadan, Ilorin and Bendel State, 1974 to 1992.

He was elected a Fellow for Operational Research (England), one of the first Africans so honored by that international professional organization in 1986. He was a consultant lecturer to the Administrative Staff College of Nigeria, the Nigerian Industrial Development Bank and the African Development Bank.

He was also external examiner to several Universities, including the City University of London.

Lambo was the Regional Adviser for health sector reforms, health care financing and health in socioeconomic development in the World Health Organization's regional office for Africa from 1990 to 1999.

He was the first economist to be employed by the WHO’s Regional Office for Africa. He introduced health economics into the work of the WHO in Africa and built/strengthened capacity in health economics in the WHO Regional Office for Africa as well as in WHO country offices in Africa before taking an early and voluntary retirement from the United Nations System in 1999. At the Regional Committee of the Ministers of Health of the African Region held in Windhoek, Namibia in 1999, he received the award of the “most hardworking staff’’ in the WHO Regional Office for Africa.

He was Director of the Change Agent (for Health Sector Reform) Program in Nigeria (a sister program to PATHS I) funded by the Department for International Development (DFID), UK with the Federal Government of Nigeria from October 2001 to July 2003.

Professor Lambo has published over sixty papers, articles and books in the areas of quantitative economics, modeling, operations research applied to health, strategic management, and health economics.

Minister of Health
In July 2003, Lambo was appointed Minister of Health of the Federal Republic of Nigeria, holding office until May 2007, making him the only economist appointed as Minister of Health in Nigeria to date and the second longest serving Minister of Health in Nigeria to date. During his tenure as Minister of Health, the first Health Sector Reform Program for Nigeria was developed and implemented; the National Health Insurance Scheme was launched after being on the drawing board for forty years. Many health policies and legislations were formulated during his tenure, including the hotly debated National Health Bill.

He was one of the few politically neutral technocrats to serve under the administration. He had a strong focus on long term health sector reform and good governance.

Nigerian Economic Society Fellowship Conferment
On September 17, 2013, Lambo was conferred with a Fellowship by the Nigerian Economic Society (NES) along with Dr. Ngozi Okonjo-Iweala in the presence of the President of the Federal Republic of Nigeria, Dr. Goodluck Ebele Jonathan, GCFR and the President of the Nigerian Economic Society (NES), Professor Akin Iwayemi.

Other activities
 Roll Back Malaria Partnership, Chairman of the Board (2005-2007)
 Medicines for Malaria Venture (MVV), Member of the Board of Directors (2003-2009)

Selected bibliography

References

1944 births
Living people
Yoruba politicians
Alumni of Lancaster University
University of Ibadan alumni
University of Rochester alumni
Academic staff of the University of Ibadan
Health ministers of Nigeria
Yoruba academics
Academic staff of the University of Ilorin